Edwin Freeman (5 June 1886 – 1945) was an English cricketer and footballer active from 1908 to 1920 who played for Northamptonshire and Northampton Town.

Career
Freeman began his football career as an amateur with Stoke in the 1904–05 season. He spent the campaign with the reserve side playing in the Birmingham & District League. After a period with non-league side Regent Templars, he played 28 times for his home-town club Northampton Town in the 1920–21 season.

Freeman appeared in sixteen first-class matches as a righthanded batsman who bowled right arm medium pace. He scored 133 runs with a highest score of 30 and took six wickets with a best performance of three for 62.

Career statistics

Notes

1886 births
1945 deaths
English cricketers
Northamptonshire cricketers
English footballers
Stoke City F.C. players
Northampton Town F.C. players
English Football League players
Association football inside forwards